Will Alexander may refer to:

Will W. Alexander (1884–1956), first president of Dillard University
Will Alexander (poet) (born 1948), American poet

See also
Willie Alexander (born 1943), American singer
Willie Alexander (American football) (born 1949), former professional American football player
William Alexander (disambiguation)
Alexander (disambiguation)
Will (disambiguation)